WUHO-LD is a low-power television station in Kalamazoo, Michigan, broadcasting locally on channel 18 as an independent station. Founded October 7, 1996, the station is owned by P & P Cable Holdings.

External links

UHO-LD
Television channels and stations established in 2002
2002 establishments in Michigan
Low-power television stations in the United States